Guillaume Thurey, born in Burgundy towards 1326, died 12 May 1365, was a French clergyman, and Bishop. He was successively canon–Count of Lyon in 1336, Bishop of Autun in 1351, then Archbishop of Lyon in 1358. He was the uncle of Philippe III de Thurey, Archbishop of Lyon.

Career
In 1348 William of Thurey founded, with his brother, Girard, a chapel in the church of Cuisery.

In 1349 he accompanied Henry de Villars, Archbishop of Lyon, to get and escort Charles, Dauphin of France.

In 1358 he was made Archbishop of Lyon. His appointment was made with support of the King of France who wanted the removal of the previous bishop and kings near relative, Charles III of Alençon. Charles had used his position as archbishop to firmly resist royal encroachment on his rights as Primate of France and Guillaume II de Thurey was chosen as the Thurey family had been strong supporters of the king.

In 1358, he sent a contingent under the command of his brother Girard Thurey against the Tard-Venus bandits who had occupied Pont-Saint-Esprit. For this he was thanked by Pope Innocent VI.

He died on 12 May 1365 and is buried at Lyon in the sanctuary of St. John's Church.

References

Archbishops of Lyon
1365 deaths